Omar Jarun (born 10 December 1983) is a Palestinian former footballer who is the assistant coach of Huntsville City in MLS Next Pro.

Jarun has played professionally in the United States, Canada, Poland, Belgium, and India.

Early and personal life
Jarun was born in Kuwait City, Kuwait to an American mother and a Palestinian father from Tulkarem. Jarun emigrated to the United States during the First Gulf War in 1990; his family escaped after bombs went off and missiles were shot near their apartment. He was raised in Peachtree City, Georgia.

Playing career

Club career
Jarun played college soccer for the University of Memphis and the University of Dayton, and has played club football for Fort Wayne Fever, Chicago Fire Premier, Atlanta Silverbacks, Vancouver Whitecaps, Flota Świnoujście, Pogoń Szczecin, FC Tampa Bay, Arka Gdynia and Charleroi.

He was released by Pogon on 1 March 2011.

Jarun signed with FC Tampa Bay of the North American Soccer League on 29 March 2011.

Jarun after brief spell with FC Tampa Bay he signed a contract with Arka Gdynia, under Petr Nemec, who was the manager that brought Jarun to Poland when he was the Flota Świnoujście manager.

On 7 January 2014 Jarun signed for NASL club Ottawa Fury FC.

Jarun signed for I-League club Bharat FC on 20 March 2015 for an 18-month deal completing the club's Asian player quota.

In June 2015 he announced his retirement from professional football. However, on 16 April 2016, it was announced that Jarun joined Premier Development League club Peachtree City MOBA.

International career
Jarun made his international debut for the Palestinian national team in 2007, and has appeared in FIFA World Cup qualifying matches, AFC Challenge Cup, WAFF Championship.

Coaching career

Following one season as a player for Peachtree City, Jarun became an assistant for the club prior to the 2017 PDL season, as owner Volker Harms took over manager duties. 2017 was a dismal season for MOBA, as they went 2-10-2 and finished last place in the division, failing to qualify for the playoffs for the second straight year. Jarun was named manager of the club for the 2018 season in November 2017, with former Jamaican international Nicholas Addlery being hired as an assistant. Alongside his duties as manager, Jarun was also a member of the MOBA youth coaching staff.

In October 2018 he became manager of the Atlanta United FC Academy.

In June 2021 he became assistant coach of Atlanta United 2 in the USL Championship.

On January 18, 2023, Jarun was named to the first-ever technical staff for MLS Next Pro club Huntsville City, the reserve side for Nashville SC.

References

1983 births
Living people
People from Peachtree City, Georgia
Sportspeople from the Atlanta metropolitan area
Sportspeople from Kuwait City
Palestinian footballers
Association football central defenders
Memphis Tigers men's soccer players
University of Memphis alumni
Dayton Flyers men's soccer players
Fort Wayne Fever players
Chicago Fire U-23 players
Atlanta Silverbacks players
Vancouver Whitecaps (1986–2010) players
Flota Świnoujście players
Pogoń Szczecin players
Tampa Bay Rowdies players
Arka Gdynia players
R. Charleroi S.C. players
Ottawa Fury FC players
Bharat FC players
Peachtree City MOBA players
USL First Division players
USL League Two players
North American Soccer League players
Palestine international footballers
Palestinian expatriate footballers
Palestinian expatriate sportspeople in the United States
Palestinian expatriate sportspeople in Canada
Palestinian expatriate sportspeople in Poland
Palestinian expatriate sportspeople in Belgium
Palestinian expatriate sportspeople in India
Expatriate soccer players in the United States
Expatriate soccer players in Canada
Expatriate footballers in Poland
Expatriate footballers in Belgium
Expatriate footballers in India
People from Tulkarm
Clayton State Lakers men's soccer coaches